Varanasi Lok Sabha constituency is one of the 80 Lok Sabha (parliamentary) constituencies in Uttar Pradesh, a state in northern India. Narendra Modi has been twice elected from this constituency to become the prime minister of India.

Vidhan Sabha Segments

Members of Lok Sabha

Election results

General election 2019

General election 2014

General election 2009

General election 2004

General election 1999

General election 1998

General election 1996

General election 1991

General election 1989

General election 1984

See also
 Varanasi district
 Varanasi (Mayoral Constituency)
 List of Constituencies of the Lok Sabha

Notes

External links 
Varanasi lok sabha  constituency election 2019 result details
Varanasi Lok Sabha - Result University

Lok Sabha constituencies in Uttar Pradesh
Politics of Varanasi district